Billy Ingram (born 11 December 1865) was an English footballer who played for Sheffield Wednesday in the 1890 FA Cup Final.

References

1865 births
1947 deaths
English footballers
Sheffield Wednesday F.C. players
Footballers from Sheffield
Association footballers not categorized by position
FA Cup Final players